This is a list of law enforcement agencies in Australia. Law enforcement in Australia is carried out on federal, state, and local levels. This is facilitated by various different uniformed 'sworn' law enforcement agencies and 'regulatory' agencies. Sworn law enforcement agencies generally consist of law enforcement officers that have powers of arrest, whereas regulatory agencies normally set out and enforce compliance of specific laws and regulations and are normally composed of non-police investigators. For more on law enforcement in Australia see Law enforcement in Australia.

Federal

Sworn Agencies
 Australian Border Force
 Australian Defence Force Investigative Service
 Australian Federal Police
 Royal Australian Air Force Police
 Royal Australian Corps of Military Police
 Royal Australian Naval Police

Regulatory Agencies
 Australian Commission for Law Enforcement Integrity
 Australian Communications and Media Authority
 Australian Competition & Consumer Commission
 Australian Criminal Intelligence Commission
 Australian Energy Market Commission
 Australian Fisheries Management Authority
 Australian Maritime Safety Authority
 Australian National Audit Office
 Australian Prudential Regulation Authority
 Australian Radiation Protection and Nuclear Safety Agency
 Australian Securities & Investments Commission
 Australian Taxation Office
 Civil Aviation Safety Authority
 Defence Security and Vetting Service
 Department of Home Affairs

State

Australian Capital Territory 
ACT Corrective Services
ACT Policing

New South Wales 

 Office of the Sheriff of New South Wales
 New South Wales Police Force
 Corrective Services New South Wales
 New South Wales Department of Primary Industries
 Norfolk Island Police Force

Northern Territory 

 Northern Territory Correctional Services
 Northern Territory Police

Queensland 

 Queensland Boating and Fisheries Patrol
 Queensland Corrective Services
 Queensland Police Service
 Queensland Parks and Wildlife Service

South Australia 

 Department for Correctional Services
 South Australia Police

Tasmania 

 Tasmania Police
 Tasmania Prison Service

Victoria 

 Victorian Fisheries Authority
 Victoria Police

Western Australia 

 Department of Corrective Services
 Western Australia Police Force

See also 

Law enforcement agencies of Australia
Australia
Australian crime-related lists